Jayne Harkins is the first woman to have served as  the U.S. Commissioner of the International Boundary and Water Commission (IBWC) for either the United States or Mexico in the commission’s 129-year history.  She was appointed by Donald Trump.

Biography
Harkins has a Bachelor of Science in Geological Engineering from the University of North Dakota and a Masters in Public Administration from the University of Nevada, Las Vegas.

Career
Much of Harkins’ career has been spent working on issues associated with the Colorado River working for both the U.S. Bureau of Reclamation as Deputy Regional Director and Colorado River Commission of Nevada (Executive Director from 2011 until 2018).

References

Year of birth missing (living people)
Living people
University of North Dakota alumni
University of Nevada, Las Vegas alumni
Trump administration personnel
United States Department of State officials